Elections to Liverpool City Council were held on 2 May 1996.  One third of the council was up for election and the Labour party achieved overall control of the council.

After the election, the composition of the council was:

Election result

Ward results

Abercromby

Aigburth

Allerton

Anfield

Arundel

Breckfield

Broadgreen

Childwall

Church

Clubmoor

County

Croxteth

Dingle

Dovecot

Everton

Fazakerley

Gillmoss

Granby

Grassendale

Kensington

Melrose

Netherley

Old Swan

Picton

Pirrie

St. Mary's

Smithdown

Speke

Tuebrook

Valley

Vauxhall

Warbreck

Woolton

By Elections

Melrose, 11 December 1997

See also

 Liverpool City Council
 Liverpool Town Council elections 1835 - 1879
 Liverpool City Council elections 1880–present
 Mayors and Lord Mayors of Liverpool 1207 to present
 History of local government in England

References

1996
1996 English local elections
1990s in Liverpool